Artyk is an urban locality (an urban-type settlement) in Oymyakonsky District of the Sakha Republic, Russia, located  from Ust-Nera, the administrative center of the district, on the right bank of the Nera River, just above the mouth of its tributary the Artyk, after which the urban-type settlement is named. As of the 2010 Census, its population was 509.

History
It was founded in the 1930s as a base for construction of the Kolyma Highway. It was granted urban-type settlement status in 1957. After the dissolution of the Soviet Union, most of the inhabitants moved elsewhere and the population plunged by 75% during the 1990s.

Administrative and municipal status
Within the framework of administrative divisions, the urban-type settlement of Artyk, together with one rural locality (the selo of Delyankir), is incorporated within Oymyakonsky District as the Settlement of Artyk. As a municipal division, the Settlement of Artyk is incorporated within Oymyakonsky Municipal District as Artyk Urban Settlement.

References

Notes

Sources
Official website of the Sakha Republic. Registry of the Administrative-Territorial Divisions of the Sakha Republic. Oymyakonsky District. 

Urban-type settlements in the Sakha Republic